The Guadeloupe national under 17s football team represents the French overseas department and region of Guadeloupe in men's international football. The team is controlled by the Ligue Guadeloupéenne de Football, a local branch of French Football Federation.The team competes in the regional tournament CONCACAF  U-17 Championship.

History

Players
The following squad were called up for the recently ended 2019 CONCACAF U-17 Championship.

Fixtures and results
legend

2019

Competitive record

FIFA U-17 World Cup

CONCACAF U-17 Championship

''*Draws include knockout matches decided on penalty kicks

References

 
Caribbean national association football teams
CONCACAF teams not affiliated to FIFA
National football teams of Overseas France